The Mayor of Daegu is the head of the local government of Daegu who is elected to a four-year term.

List of mayors

Appointed mayors (before 1995) 
From 1945 to 1995, the Mayor of Daegu was appointed by the President of the Republic of Korea.

Directly elected mayors (1995–present) 
Since 1995, under provisions of the revised Local Government Act, the Mayor of Daegu is elected by direct election.

Elections 
Source:

1995

1998

2002

2006

2010

2014

2018

2022

See also 
 Government of South Korea
 Politics of South Korea

References 

Government of Daegu
Lists of political office-holders in South Korea